Death Requisite is a heavy metal band from Sarasota, Florida. The band describes their style as "blackened symphonic melodic technical death metal" or simply "extreme hybrid metal". The band has played with Living Sacrifice, Extol, Zao, Norma Jean, and Sleeping Giant. The band is signed to Rottweiler Records.

Background

Death Requisite is a melodic death metal band which originated in Sarasota, Florida. The band formed in 1999 and broke up 2005. In 2010, they re-formed. Since then they have released three EPs, Prophets of Doom, Second Death, and Threnody. In June 2016, the band signed to Rottweiler Records. The band released their new album, Revisitation in the fall of 2016, through Rottweiler. The album had several reviews by notable musicians, including Kevin Tubby of Broken Flesh, Michael Cook of A Hill to Die Upon, and Kelly Shaefer of Atheist. Revisitation was released on November 25, 2016. Bassist RTJ left the band 2016 and was unofficially replaced by Gabriel Blackmore, Dave Blackmore's son. Vocalist Vincent St. James departed from the band in 2017. The band would later reveal that they were working with new material with Johanna Fincher on soprano vocals. The band released a picture of them with former vocalist St. James, along with Blackmore and another man, revealing the upcoming album will have five vocalists featured throughout. On May 10, 2018, Rottweiler and the band released the artwork, the release date and title of the EP, known as Thernody, which launched on June 29, 2018.

Name

The band's name is derived from a quote from Stanislaw Lec.

Members

Current
 Vincent Saint James Clerval – vocals (2012–2017, 2018-2019 [Live], 2019-present)
 Johanna Fincher – soprano vocals (2017-2019 [Live], 2019–present)
 Dave "Requisite" "DJ" Blackmore – lead guitar, keyboards, backing vocals (1998–2005, 2010–present)
 Gabriel Blackmore – bass (2016-2019 [Live], 2019–present)
 "Sir" William Lee – drums (2001-2005, 2010–present)

Live musicians
 Jamon Dane – vocals (2001-2004)
 Logan Thompson - guitars (2018) (Symphony of Heaven)

Former
 Marcus "Matthias" – vocals (1998-2000, 2001)
 Dennis – vocals (2000)
 Tyrannus – vocals (2010–2012)
 Trevor – bass (1998-1999), rhythm guitar (1999–2001), vocals (2001–2002)
 Matthew – rhythm guitar (2000-2001)
 Eric – rhythm guitar (2003)
 Thadius – rhythm guitar (2002-2005)
 Joseph "ov" Moria – rhythm guitar (2013–2017)
 Gomez – bass (2002–2005)
 Jon – bass (1999–2002)
 Cuinn Griffen – bass (2010–2014)
 Justin "Regnal the Just" – bass (2014–2016)
 Josh – drums (1999–2001)

Timeline

Discography
EPs
 Living Sanctuary (2000, Independent) 
 Thanatopsis (2004, JDA) 
 Prophets of Doom (2011, Independent) 
 Second Death (2013, Independent)
 Thernody (June 29, 2018, Rottweiler)

Studio albums
 From Death to Life (2001, JDA) 
 Revisitation (November 25, 2016, Rottweiler)

Demo
 Unreleased Demo (1999)

Singles
 "Revisitation" (2015)
 "Redemptio Per Deicide" (2016)
 "Tormentor" (2018)

Compilation appearances
 A Brutal Christmas: The Season in Chaos (2002; Sounds of the Dead Records)
 The Bearded Dragon's Sampler (2.0) (2016; The Bearded Dragon Productions)
 The Pack Vol. 1 (2016; Rottweiler)
 Metal From The Dragon (Vol. 2) (2017; The Bearded Dragon Productions)
 The Pack Vol. 2 (2018; Rottweiler)

References

External links
Death Requisite on Blogspot
Death Requisite on PureVolume

Musical groups established in 1999
Musical groups disestablished in 2005
Musical groups reestablished in 2010
Rottweiler Records artists
1999 establishments in Florida
American Christian metal musical groups